This article describes the nine airconditioned sitting cars and fourteen guard's vans that were constructed by the South Australian Railways at Islington Workshops between 1964 and 1967. All were distinguished by fluted stainless steel panels on their sides, compatible with the appearance of cars introduced to The Overland in 1950.

The new cars ran on the East-West Express between Adelaide and Port Pirie in lieu of late-1930s, non-airconditioned main line passenger cars. The broad gauge system had been extended north to Port Pirie in 1937 to meet a southern extension from Port Augusta on the Commonwealth Railways' standard gauge system, creating Port Pirie as a break-of-gauge and transshipment point. To encourage passengers to use the line despite the inconvenience of changing trains, a cafeteria car – the forerunner of The Overland cars – had been built in 1947. The new sitting cars were also allocated to the Blue Lake Express to Mount Gambier. The guard's vans operated widely on  the SAR and, in the 1980s, the Victorian Railways.

Fleet details

Cafeteria Car C1

Cafeteria Car, alternatively known as C1, was constructed at the South Australian Railways' Islington Railway Workshops in 1947, as one of the first Australian railway vehicles utilising corrugated stainless steel plates for the exterior. The rest of the vehicle was constructed using Corten steel. The design was based on then-modern Streamliner trains in the United States, which had been observed by the Chief Mechanical Engineer, Mr F H Harrison, on his tour to the United States around the end of World War II. The Cafeteria Car became the testing board for concepts to be included in the new The Overland fleet, and was intended to "surpass other buffet cars" in manufacture quality and passenger comfort; the design was detailed down to the level of the food trays, which were introduced on the vehicle long before they became common practice on airlines.

It is thought that the vehicle was originally planned to be used on the Overland, but in practice that service included stops at on-platform restaurants en route, and the remnant dining cars (like Avoca and Hopkins) from the pre-corrugated era were kept in service.

The car was constructed using the side frames as the primary load-carrying system, with formed steel channels forming the body sides between the window frames; the sum framework of each vehicle comprises well over four hundred parts. Rockwool insulation was packed into the carriage side voids, sewn in place with copper wire, and the body was finished with fluted aluminium strips (later stainless steel) riveted or screwed in place, giving the classic look of the series.

Harrison had originally specified Plymetl for the interior partitions, which was a five-sheet-thick plywood with steel panels on the exterior. This was unavailable due to federal financial policy, so a similar material was obtained from England, called Plymax.

The car was fitted with an underfloor generator set in addition to the standard axle-driven generator; both were used to supply power to the air conditioning system (the first South Australian Railways vehicle to be so fitted) and the refrigeration for the kitchen area.

The interior was organised with toilets at one end, and a central kitchen flanked either side with eight tables. The tables on the kitchen side sat four each; two against the wall and two on loose chairs in the main aisle. The tables on the other side sat two each, both against the wall, and the total capacity was 46 sitting passengers.

When it first entered service, the vehicle was fitted with full-width concertina diaphragms and a full-depth diaphragm, and painted royal blue along the windowline; no colour photos of that scheme exist. Because of the concertinas the vehicle had to be marshalled adjacent to steel carriages or V&SAR jointly-owned stock to prevent damage. Additionally, since the vehicle did not have doors on either side, access was only available from adjacent vehicles, including stock deliveries for the kitchen staff. Externally the vehicle was left unpainted on the corrugated sections and with black undergear, but all other surfaces were a deep royal blue. Internally, the car was painted beige including the tables; the upholstery was brown. The tables were fitted with an aluminium strip around the edges, and the floor was a black and white chequered linoleum surface. The design was improved in 1953 with the fitting of shock absorbers between the axle boxes and the bogie frames.

In the early 1960s the Cafeteria Car was repainted with a dark green replacing the previous blue, to give the car something of an inverse version of the livery then applied to the Steel fleet - then painted green with a cream band along the windows. The roof was repainted black at the same time.

The car caught fire in 1967 at Bowmans and was completely gutted, requiring a complete internal rebuild. As part of those works the full-width concertinas were removed from the ends and replaced with the regular style, and the car was repainted into the then-modern Regal Red and silver scheme as applied to the Overland stock and the new AD and BD cars.

The original Bradken bogies, similar to those used under the 500, 600 and 700 series cars, were replaced in 1971 with Commonwealth style bogies. The old bogies were then fitted to car DC783.

In 1982 the vehicle was hired to Victoria, to provide on-train catering as a temporary measure until enough of the new BRN and BRS buffet cars entered service; it was first observed as a regular vehicle on the Gippslander service to Sale. However, the car was found to have considerable rust in the frames during an overhaul, so the lease was cancelled and the car returned to Australian National in 1986. On arrival it was transferred to temporary bogies and stored at Islington Railway Workshops; in June 1988 it was purchased by the Port Dock Station Museum (now the National Railway Museum), where it was removed from its bogies and restored.

D type carriages

During the latter half of the Joint Stock series' construction, the South Australian Railways chose to build a handful of carriages to provide upgraded accommodation on the East-West Express from Adelaide to Port Pirie. Over the period 1964 to 1967 nine carriages and fourteen guard's vans were constructed at Islington Railway Workshops, using similar methods to those applied in the building of the Cafeteria Car and the Joint Stock fleet.

The fleet initially consisted of six identical cars AD 1 and 2 (for first class passengers) and BD 1, 2, 3 and 4 (for second class passengers), each with 70 seats arranged in a saloon format, and three composite cars ABD 1, 2 and 3, with 68 seats. The intention was to run the cars as two four-car sets with one composite vehicle on standby, providing capacity for 278 passengers. The only difference between the classes was in the colour of carpet and the quality of the upholstery, to save on construction costs. All seats were capable of rotating and reclining, as paired units either side of the central aisle. A full-height partition was constructed at the middle of the car to divide smoking and non-smoking sections, with the former having room for 36 passengers and the latter 34; in the case of the composite carriages, both halves would only seat 34, and neither saloon was allocated to smoking passengers.

A full-width vestibule was provided only at one end and separated from the non-smoking saloon (or second class saloon, in the composite cars) by a swing door. The vestibule was fitted on both sides with two-part doors allowing train staff to lean out of the carriages if necessary, and ground level steps were the standard with a folding flap that could be added when the train was stopped at a platform. The Ladies toilet and powder room were provided either side of the vestibule through the aisle, and the air conditioning equipment and electrical control panels were contained in a full-height cupboard built into the ladies toilet room. The men's toilet is located at the far end of the smoking saloon. In the case of composite cars, both men's and ladies' toilets are provided at both ends of each carriage, with no ladies powder room fitted.

In 1967 the three composite cars were converted to first class exclusively, and recoded from ABD 1-3 to AD 3-5 respectively. It is not clear whether this entailed increasing capacity from 68 to 70 passengers each.

Each car was powered individually by an underfloor auxiliary diesel engine, driving an AC alternator which would supply power for the air conditioning and lighting. When the cars were converted to standard gauge, that system was removed and the cars were instead fitted with standard 415vDC head end power sockets.

About 1975 the entire fleet of sitting cars was altered to allow a future conversion to standard gauge, which occurred from 1982 when the line from Port Pirie to Adelaide was converted. The first few conversions retained their original classes, but in the mid 1980s they were changed to AG (first class) and BG (second class) to tie in better with the former Commonwealth Railways (now Australian National Railways)' coding system. Cars AD 1-5 became AG 376-372 in descending order, and cars BD1-4 became BG370, 368, 369 and 371; though car 372 spent a few months as second class car BG372.

In the early 1990s the cars were fitted with showers, and the seating capacity was increased to 80 per car; the first class carriages were then fitted with external "Indian Pacific" name boards, and the second class carriages with "Ghan" nameboards. The Indian Pacific stock was repainted to plain silver, and the Ghan stock similar but with a gradient yellow-orange band fitted along the windowline. As part of the refurbishment, BG369 was recoded AG369 and included in the Indian Pacific group. In 1997 the entire fleet was sold to Great Southern Rail, and in 2002-2003 the cars were sold to a third party and leased back for operational purposes. Sometime after 2003, car AG369's seating was reduced to 48 passengers due to the fitting of a disabled toilet.

Guard's vans

From 1965, Islington Railway Workshops adapted the D type carriage design to provide fourteen large guard's vans for South Australian traffic. The first trials were scheduled in mid May, and within a few months the first five of the new CD class vans had entered traffic. They were initially used on passenger trains between Adelaide and Port Pirie on the 10th of June, and from July 5 they were also used on the Blue Lake train to Mount Gambier.

The centre compartment was designed with a partially-removable floor, to allow for fish to be stored under the car body and provide air-cooling while the train was in motion. The layout of the car allowed all goods compartments to be loaded from a shorter platform at once, but gave a lesser ride quality for the guard than was provided in the later CO vans, which had a similar layout but with the guard's compartment between two of the three goods compartments.

The guard had a 47-gallon water tank under the floor to provide for the toilet and wash basin; and concertinas were provided at both ends of each car to ensure that traffic staff were protected if passing between cars.

The final three vans, planned to be CD12, 13 and 14, were instead stored at Islington Railway Workshops on transfer bogies after they were completed in May 1967. They were held until January 1970, when they entered service as standard gauge vans SCD 1, 2 and 3 for local traffic between Port Pirie and Broken Hill. However, van SCD3 was taken from that service on occasion and used as a replacement for one of the two CO vans on the Overland, when they required maintenance.

All vans were included in the sale of the South Australian Railways fleet to Australian National Railways in 1975. In 1987 guards' vans were recoded to meet the new Railways of Australia identification standard, and the CD vans took on the new code AVCY for Australian National, Van, 3rd type, and high speed / fixed gauge. The program was followed up a few years later with a recoding to AVCP, marking the vans for passenger services, and vans 2, 3, 5, 6, 7, 8, 9, 378, 379, 389 and 391 were recoded as such. Overlapping with this program was the application of Australian National numbers, with van CD4 becoming AVCY389, 10 to 391 and 11 to 392, and SCD1 renumbered to 378 and 3 to 379. Other vans were allocated 300-series numbers, but were scrapped before the new numbers could be applied.

From 1982 to around 1988 four vans, CD1, 2, 3 and 7, were leased to the Victorian Railways for use on country services in their state while awaiting conversion of AZ carriages to ACZ format.

From the mid 80's the vans were proving surplus to requirements, as fewer, longer trains were being operated and the railways were gradually exiting the small parcels business. Vans 4, 6, 8, 9, 10 and 11 were removed from normal service, refurbished and repainted with blue roofs and ends, and yellow and red stripes on the sides, and converted into a fixed consist called the Jubilee Trade Train. The train toured South Australia celebrating local industries over the 150 years since the introduction of European immigrants.

In 1991 van AVCY391 was pulled from the Jubilee consist storage and converted to OWR392, for the RICE and TRAINS services; respectively, Remote and Isolated Children's Exercise, and Trans Australian Community Services consists. It was withdrawn after catching fire a few years later.

The entire fleet had been withdrawn by 1990, and in 1993 all bar AVCP2 had been scrapped; the final vehicle followed in early 1994.

Model railways
HO scale polyester resin kits for the Cafeteria Car occasionally appear online for purchase; no ready-to-run versions of the vehicle have been produced. An approximation of the Cafeteria Car and the D fleet can be achieved by using components from Lima carriages.

References

Victorian Railways carriages